Ludwig Georg Strauss (5 July 1949 - 29 May 2013) was a German nuclear medicine physician and professor of radiology at the University of Heidelberg.

Biography 
Strauss studied medicine from 1969 to 1975 at the Justus Liebig University in Gießen and mathematics from 1973 to 1975 at the same university, receiving his medical degree in 1978. His doctoral thesis was on “Vergleichende Untersuchung verschiedener Radio-in-vitro-Tests zur Beurteilung der Schildrüsenfunktion unter Berücksichtigung mehrerer Parameter”.  

Strauss was born in Worms, Germany. He died on 29 May 2013 due to cancer.

References

External links
List of Professor Dr. Strauss' PubMed publications
Citations in google scholar
List of Professor Dr. Strauss' publications in ResearchGate

2013 deaths
1949 births
German nuclear medicine physicians